The 2018 Euro Winners Cup was the sixth edition of the Euro Winners Cup (EWC), an annual continental beach soccer tournament for men's top-division European clubs. The championship is the sport's version of the better known UEFA Champions League in association football.

Organised by Beach Soccer Worldwide (BSWW), the tournament was held in Nazaré, Portugal, from 25 May till 3 June 2018, consisting of a preliminary qualifying round and the competition proper.

Following the qualifying round, the competition proper began with a round-robin group stage. At its conclusion, the best teams progressed to the knockout stage, a series of single-elimination games to determine the winners, starting with the round of 16 and ending with the final. Consolation matches were also played to determine other final rankings.

Braga of Portugal were the defending champions and successfully defended their title after beating Kristall of Russia on penalties in the final.

Teams
A record 58 teams have entered the championship; 26 qualify straight into the main round, whilst 32 compete in the Nazaré Cup / preliminary round to attempt to qualify for the competition proper.

26 different nations are represented.

Qualification
As per BSWW regulations, qualification for the 2018 EWC is achieved as follows:

The reigning champions qualify automatically into the main round (Braga of Portugal).
The winners of all European national beach soccer leagues/championships are entitled to automatic qualification into the main round (but no league champion from Portugal qualified as this was Braga who had already qualified as current EWC champions).
The host club qualifies automatically to the main round (ACD Sótão), along with the winners and runners-up of its country's national league. (As a Portuguese club, the winners of its country's league was Braga who had already qualified. Therefore, this spot was rewarded to the team that finished third in the FPF Campeonato Nacional.)
Any other club who did not win their respective national league can enter the Nazaré Cup / preliminary round for a last attempt to qualify for the main round.

Entrants
For context, in February 2018, BSWW deemed the top four leagues in Europe to be (in no particular order) the Portuguese, Russian, Italian and Spanish leagues.

Key: H: Hosts \ TH: Title holders

Venues

Two venues were used in one host city: Nazaré and Leiria District. Matches took place at Praia de Nazaré (Nazaré Beach) on one of two pitches. The main pitch, otherwise known as the Estádio do Viveiro (Viveiro Stadium), with a capacity of 1,600, hosted 79 matches, including all main bracket ties in the knockout stage. Pitch 2, a purpose made pitch, located adjacent to the main stadium, hosted 48 matches.

Squads
Each club must submit a squad of a maximum of 12 players that includes a minimum of two goalkeepers. Players are to be assigned shirt numbers between 1 and 22 (the number 1 must be reserved for a goalkeeper). Three delegates must accompany the players, including at least one medical personnel. A maximum of three foreign players are allowed to be part of the squad. This was later increased to four, however a maximum of three of these players are permitted to play in a match.

Draws
The draws took place on May 9 at 12:00 local time in Nazaré, at the Biblioteca Municipal de Nazaré (Nazaré Public Library), conducted by the Mayor of Nazaré, Walter Chicharro, PFP Director Pedro Dias, BSWW Deputy Vice-President, Gabino Renales and BSWW Head of Competitions, Josep Ponset.

Nazaré Cup (preliminary round)
The BSWW organising committee decided to split the 32 teams into eight groups of four, conducting the draw as follows:

Main round
The BSWW organising committee decided to split the 34 teams into seven groups of four and two groups of three. Two of the groups of four involve the eight qualifiers from the preliminary round. This meant the draw concerned determining just five of the seven groups of four, conducted as follows:

Nazaré Cup (incl. preliminary round)

The preliminary round is open to all clubs who did not automatically qualify for the main round as domestic league champions.

Overview

Decision to make changes
The preliminary round has undergone considerable changes. In last season's EWC, five of the eight quarter-finalists and three of the four semifinalists qualified via this route; just three teams in the quarter-finals and one team in the semi-finals was an automatic qualifier / national league champion.

To protect the competition's original purpose as a championship primarily for Europe's league champions, BSWW made changes ensuring that this year only two quarter-finalists and subsequently one semifinalist would be non-champion qualifiers from the preliminary round. Three semifinalists were guaranteed to be a national league champion.

This was later revised so that only one team in the quarter-finals would be a qualifier, whilst the other seven would be guaranteed to be a league champion. A qualifier was no longer ensured of a semifinal spot.

Format
This season, embedded within the wider scope of this edition of the Euro Winners Cup, an additional tournament will be taking place. It has been described as a "tournament within a tournament". This supplementary event is known as the Nazaré Beach Soccer Cup (NBSC):-

Group A

Group B

Group C

Group D

Group E

Group F

Group G

Group H

Subsequent rounds

Second group stage

The eight qualifiers progressed to the second group stage that took place as part of the main round of the EWC.

Final

The best two teams of the second group stage advanced to the final that took place as part of the round of 16 of the EWC.

Main round

The Main Round commenced on 28 May and ended on 30 May.

34 teams entered into the Main Round – 26 European domestic league champions (and select league runners-up) who qualify automatically plus eight qualifiers from the preliminary round, competing in a round robin format.

Official practice sessions for the automatic qualifiers took place on 26 and 27 May.

Nazaré Cup qualifiers draw:

The draw to split the eight Nazaré Cup qualifiers into two groups of four took place on 27 May, after the conclusion of the day's matches.

All eight clubs were placed in one pot. As the clubs were drawn, they were alternately placed in Groups H and I. The draw was conducted by Leticia Villar of AIS Playas de San Javier Women and Aaron Clarke of Levante.

The Main Round fixtures for Groups A–G were announced on 17 May. The matches for the Nazaré Cup qualifiers groups (H and I) were released on 27 May once the composition of said groups was confirmed.

All times are local, WEST (UTC+1).

Group A

Group B

Group C

Group D

Group E

Group F

Group G

Group H (Nazaré Cup qualifiers – group 1)

Group I (Nazaré Cup qualifiers – group 2)

Knockout stage
From Groups A–G of the Main Round, all seven groups winners and seven runners-up (originally, only five from seven runners-up) advance to the knockout stage (total of 14 clubs).

Originally, from Groups H and I (Nazaré Cup qualifiers groups), the winners and runners-up from both groups were to advance to the knockout stage (a total of four clubs). However the format was later revised; only the winners of each group (two clubs) now advance to play in the knockout stage. These two clubs remain separate from the other 14 in the Round of 16 draw.

In the knockout stage, the clubs compete in single-elimination matches. Consolation matches are also played to determine the final rankings involving the clubs knocked out of each round of the knockout stage.

Round of 16 draw:

The Round of 16 draw was conducted on 30 May following the conclusion of the day's matches. The two qualifiers from the Nazaré Cup groups were automatically drawn against each other and allocated to the bottom of the bracket. The other 14 clubs were placed into two pots of seven. The group winners were placed in Pot 1 and the runners-up were placed in Pot 2.

For each Round of 16 tie, a group winner from Pot 1 was drawn to play against a runner-up from Pot 2. However, clubs from the same group could not be drawn against each other. As each tie was drawn, they were allocated chronologically from top to bottom in the bracket below. The draw was conducted by the Mayor of Nazaré, Walter Chicharro and Anastasia Osinovskaya of WFC Zvezda.

Round of 16

Quarter-finals

9th–16th place

1st–8th place

Semi-finals

13th–16th place

9th–12th place

5th–8th place

1st–4th place

Finals

15th place match

13th place match

11th place match

9th place match

7th place match

5th place match

3rd place match

Championship final

Awards
The following individual awards were presented after the final.

1. Goals scored during the preliminary round were not counted for this award.

Top goalscorers
Players who scored at least 5 goals

Goals scored in both the competition proper and the preliminary round are counted.

21 goals
 Llorenç Gómez ( Falfala Kfar Qassem)

15 goals

 Vladislav Aksenov ( Bate Borisov)
 Gabriele Gori ( Viareggio)
 Cem Keskin ( Alanya Belediyespor)

13 goals

 Christian Biermann ( Melistar Melilla)
 Lucão ( Lokomotiv)
 Jordan Santos ( Sporting)

12 goals

 Carlos Carballo ( Casa Benfica de Loures)
 Leo Martins ( Braga)
 Mauricinho ( Kristall)
 Noel Ott ( Falfala Kfar Qassem)

11 goals

 Kirill Romanov ( Kristall)

10 goals

 Bokinha ( Braga)
 Oleg Zborovskiy ( Vybor)

9 goals

 Alan ( Casa Benfica de Loures)
 Chiky ( Melistar)
 Eudin ( Catania)
 Amar Yatim ( Falfala Kfar Qassem)

8 goals

 Bensinha ( Sporting)
 Filip Filipov ( Spartak Varna)
 Maci ( West Deva)
 Ozu Moreira ( Falfala Kfar Qassem)
 Dmitry Shishin ( Kristall)

7 goals

 Lucas Calmon ( Boca Gdańsk)
 Fábio da Costa ( Leixões)
 Jeffrey Klijbroek ( Egmond)
 Daniel Krawczyk ( Lódz)
 Pedro Moran ( Sambenedettese)
 Boris Nikonorov ( Lokomotiv)
 Rando Rand ( Nõmme)
 Rodrigo ( Kristall)
 Bryan Yano ( Viareggio)
 Filipe ( Braga)

6 goals

 Daniel Baran ( Boca Gdańsk)
 Francesco Corosiniti ( Catania)
 Fabricio ( Casa Benfica de Loures)
 Dmitrijs Jakovlevs ( Kreiss)
 Be Martins ( Braga)
 Pablo Perez ( Sambenedettese)
 Dario Ramachiotti ( Viareggio)
 Aleh Slavutsin ( Bate Borisov)
 Eduard Suarez ( Dynamo Batumi)
 Witold Ziober ( Boca Gdańsk)

5 goals

 Ihar Bryshtel ( Bate Borisov)
 Jeremy Bru ( Marsielle)
 Miguel Carvalho ( GR Amigos Paz)
 Marco Costa da Silva ( Salgueiros 08)
 Cuman ( Alanya Belediyespor)
 Andre Goncalves ( Portsmouth)
 Glenn Hodl ( Boca Gdańsk)
 Jordan ( Sambenedettese)
 Madjer ( Sporting)
 Tiago Miguel Mateus ( Casa Benfica de Loures)
 Nelito ( Lokomotiv)
 Artur Paporotnyi ( Lokomotiv)
 Mikhail Semenov ( APS Napoli Patron)
 Dzianis Samsonov ( Bate Borisov)
 Dejan Stankovic ( Catania)
 Emmanuele Zurlo ( Catania)

Source

Final standings

See also
2018 Women's Euro Winners Cup

References

External links
Nazaré Beach Soccer Cup  (preliminary round), at Beach Soccer Worldwide
Euro Winners Cup proper, at Beach Soccer Worldwide
Euro Winners Cup 2018 , at Beach Soccer Russia (in Russian)

Euro Winners Cup
Euro
2018
2018 in beach soccer
Nazaré, Portugal
Euro Winners Cup
Euro Winners Cup